Gaël Monfils was the defending champion, but did not compete in the Juniors in this year.

Donald Young defeated Kim Sun-yong (6–2, 6–4) in the final.

Seeds

Draw

Finals

Top half

Section 1

Section 2

Bottom half

Section 3

Section 4

Sources
Draw

Boys' Singles
Australian Open, 2005 Boys' Singles